Angus Morrison may refer to:

 Angus Morrison (pianist) (1902–1989), English pianist
 Angus Morrison (politician) (1822–1882), Ontario lawyer and political figure, mayor of Toronto, 1876–1878
 Angus Morrison (canoeist) (born 1952), American slalom and sprint canoeist
 Angus James Morrison (1900–1952), provincial-level politician in Alberta, Canada
 Angus Morrison (footballer) (1924–2002), Scottish footballer
 Angus Morrison (minister) (born 1953), minister of the Church of Scotland